The 1926 United States Senate election in North Carolina was held on November 2, 1926. Incumbent Democratic Senator Lee Slater Overman was re-elected to a fifth term in office, defeating Republican Johnson Jay Hayes.

Democratic primary

Candidates
Lee Slater Overman, incumbent Senator since 1903
Robert Rice Reynolds, Asheville attorney

Results

General election

Results

Footnotes

1926
North Carolina
1926 North Carolina elections